Edward Litton PC (1787 – 22 January 1870) was an Irish Conservative politician.  From 1837 to 1843 he was Member of Parliament (MP) for Coleraine, in the House of Commons of the United Kingdom of Great Britain and Ireland.

Litton was elected to the Parliament at the general election in 1837, regaining for the Conservatives a seat which had been won by the Liberals in 1835. He was re-elected unopposed in 1841, but left Parliament in 1843 to take up an appointment as Master of Chancery in Ireland.

Related people
Litton's greatgrandson (through his son George and grandson John), Henry Litton, is a retired judge in Hong Kong. 

His another grandson through George, George So Litton, was the founder of the Litton Mills  in Pasig, the Philippines, and one of his greatgrandson through George So is Johnny Litton.

References

External links 
 

1787 births
1870 deaths
Members of the Parliament of the United Kingdom for County Londonderry constituencies (1801–1922)
Irish Conservative Party MPs
UK MPs 1837–1841
UK MPs 1841–1847
Members of the Privy Council of Ireland